The 2009 Latvian Figure Skating Championships was held in Riga from December 19 to 20, 2008. Skaters competed in the disciplines of ladies' singles.

Senior results

Ladies

External links
 results

2008 in figure skating
Latvian Figure Skating Championships, 2009